Victor Van Vugt is a music producer, mixer and engineer. An Australian based in New York, he has had a long association with the careers of Nick Cave and the Bad Seeds and Beth Orton. He has also worked with the likes of P.J. Harvey, Depeche Mode, Gogol Bordello, The Pogues, The Fall, Einstürzende Neubauten,  Billy Bragg, Luna, Athlete, Alison Moyet, The Disposable Heroes of Hiphoprisy and Australian acts such as Sarah Blasko, Clare Bowditch, The Panics, Augie March, Robert Forster, Dave Graney, The Triffids, The Go-Betweens and The Blackeyed Susans .

The Nick Cave & Kylie Minogue duet, "Where The Wild Roses Grow", produced by Van Vugt, won the ARIA Award for Song Of The Year in 1996.

The Nick Cave and the Bad Seeds album "Murder Ballads" was nominated for Album Of The Year.

The P.J. Harvey album "Stories From The City, Stories From The Sea" won the Mercury Prize Album Of The Year and was nominated for Best Alternative Album Of The Year, Grammy Award.

The Beth Orton album "Trailer Park" was nominated for the Mercury Prize, Album Of The Year.

The Beth Orton album "Central Reservation" was nominated for Album Of The Year, Brit Award.

The Athlete album Vehicles & Animals, produced, mixed & engineered by Van Vugt was nominated for the Mercury Prize in 2003.
The Emmett Tinley album Attic Faith, produced, mixed & engineered by Van Vugt was nominated for the Choice Music Prize in 2005.

Credits include 
 1984 The Moodists: Thirsty's Calling
 1985 The Apartments: The Evening Visits...and Stays For Years
 1987 Claw Boys Claw: Crack My Nut
 1989 Nick Cave and the Bad Seeds: The Good Son
 1992 Epic Soundtracks: Rise Above
 1993 Kirsty MacColl: Titanic Days
 1994 Luna: Bewitched
 1995 Dave Graney & The Coral Snakes: The Soft 'N' Sexy Sound
 1995 Mick Harvey: Intoxicated Man
 1995 The Walkabouts: Devil's Road
 1996 Nick Cave and the Bad Seeds: Murder Ballads
 1996 Beth Orton: Trailer Park
 1997 Mick Harvey: Pink Elephants
 1997 The Walkabouts: Nighttown
 1997 The Blackeyed Susans: Spin the Bottle
 1998 Augie March: Thanks for the Memes
 1999 Beth Orton: Central Reservation
 2001 P.J. Harvey: Stories from the City, Stories from the Sea
 2001 Anika Moa: Thinking Room
 2002 Beth Orton: Daybreaker
 2003 Athlete: Vehicles & Animals
 2004 Emmett Tinley: Attic Faith
 2005 Athlete: Tourist
 2005 Fischerspooner: Odyssey
 2005 Shivaree: Who's Got Trouble
 2005 Sons and Daughters: The Repulsion Box'
 2006 Sarah Blasko: What the Sea Wants, The Sea Will Have
 2006 Barry Adamson: Stranger on the Sofa
 2006 Mojave 3: Puzzles Like You
 2007 Favourite Sons: Down Beside Your Beauty
 2007 Gogol Bordello: Super Taranta!
 2007 The Panics: Cruel Guard
 2007 Emma Pollock: Watch the Fireworks
 2007 Voxtrot: Voxtrot
 2008 Liam Frost: We Ain't Got No Money, Honey But We Got Rain
 2008 The Hampdens: The Last Party
 2009 The Brute Chorus: The Brute Chorus
 2010 Clare Bowditch: Modern Day Addiction
 2010 Lucky Soul: A Coming Of Age
 2010 Glenn Richards: Glimjack
 2011 Dave Graney: Rock 'n' Roll Is Where I Hide
 2011 Seeker Lover Keeper: Seeker Lover Keeper
 2011 The Knocks: The Magic
 2013 The Levellers: Static On The Airwaves
 2013 Clubfeet: Heirs and Graces
 2013 Adalita: All Day Venus
 2016 Rita Redshoes: Her
 2017 Cub Sport: Bats
 2018 Them There: Love is an Elevator
 2019 Robert Forster: Inferno

References

External links
[ Allmusicguide entry]

Australian record producers
Year of birth missing (living people)
Living people
Australian people of Belgian descent